Baumer is a surname. People with the surname include the following:
Bettina Baumer (born 1940), an Austrian-born Indian scholar of religion
Christoph Baumer (born 1952), a Swiss scholar and explorer
Daniela Baumer (born 1971), a Swiss sprint canoer
Jim Baumer (1931–1996), an American infielder and front office executive 
Lewis Baumer (1870–1963), an English caricaturist
Susie Baumer (born 1966), an Australian swimmer
Thomas Baumer (born 1960), a Swiss economist, interculturalist and personality assessor
Uwe Schulten-Baumer (1926–2014), a former German show jumping and dressage rider

See also 
Baumer (band)
Bäumer

German-language surnames
Surnames of Swiss origin
de:Baumer
Surnames of Brazilian origin